Shehzad Butt (born 4 February 1974) is a Pakistani first-class cricketer who played for Lahore cricket team.

References

External links
 

1974 births
Living people
Pakistani cricketers
Lahore cricketers
Cricketers from Lahore